Hajjiabad (also Romanized as Ḩājjīābād; also known as Ḩaq Verdī) is a village in Khorram Dasht Rural District, Kamareh District, Khomeyn County, Markazi Province, Iran. At the 2006 census, its population was 40, in 10 families.

References 

Populated places in Khomeyn County